A discography of the Welsh rock band Man.

For a full discography see  "The Manband Archive". In July 2017 this listed 423 releases, on 75 labels, in 24 countries.

Contemporary albums
This includes studio albums and those live albums that were released contemporaneously. For live albums that were issued much later, see Archive Albums below. The 2007/2008 re-issues were completely re-mastered, and issued with bonus tracks and/or bonus CDs

Revelation LP (January 1969) Pye
Micky Jones, Deke Leonard, Ray Williams, Jeff Jones, Clive John
2 Ozs of Plastic with a Hole in the Middle LP (September 1969) Dawn
Micky Jones, Deke Leonard, Ray Williams, Jeff Jones, Clive John
Man LP (March 1971) Liberty: CD (1998) Point PNTVP117CD: CD Remix (2007) Esoteric ECLEC 2012
Micky Jones, Deke Leonard, Martin Ace, Terry Williams, Clive John
Do You Like It Here Now, Are You Settling In? LP (November 1971) United Artists:  CD Remix (2007) Esoteric ECLEC 2013
Micky Jones, Deke Leonard, Martin Ace, Terry Williams, Clive John
 Greasy Truckers Party (with other artists) LP (April 1972) UK: United Artists UDX 203/4:  CD (1997) Point PNTVP 104:  CD Re-mix (2007) EMI 0999 503235 2 4
Micky Jones, Deke Leonard, Martin Ace, Terry Williams
 Live at the Padget Rooms, Penarth  LP (September 1972) United Artists USP1000:  CD (1997) BGO CD 365:  CD Re-mix (2007) Esoteric ECLEC 2014
Micky Jones, Deke Leonard, Martin Ace, Terry Williams
Be Good to Yourself at Least Once a Day LP (November 1972) United Artists: CD (1991) BGO CD 14:  CD Remix (2007) Esoteric ECLEC 2019
Micky Jones,Will Youatt, Terry Williams, Phil Ryan, Clive John
 Christmas at the Patti (with other artists) LP (July 1973) United Artists: CD (1997) Point PNTVP110CD:  CD Re-mix (2007) Esoteric ECLEC 2018
Micky Jones, Will Youatt, Terry Williams, Phil Ryan, Clint Space (Clive John) with Dave Edmunds, Stan Pfeiffer
Back into the Future LP (September 1973) United Artists: CD (1993) BGO CD 211: CD Re-mix (2008) Esoteric ECLEC 2060
Micky Jones, Tweke Lewis, Will Youatt, Terry Williams, Phil Ryan
Rhinos, Winos and Lunatics LP (May 1974) United Artists: CD (1993) BGO CD 208:  CD Re-mix (2007) Esoteric ECLEC 2020
Micky Jones, Deke Leonard, Ken Whaley, Terry Williams, Malcolm Morley
Slow Motion LP (October 1974) United Artists: CD (1993) BGO CD 209: CD Re-mix (2008) Esoteric ECLEC 2062
Micky Jones, Deke Leonard, Ken Whaley, Terry Williams
Maximum Darkness LP (September 1975) United Artists: CD (1991) BGO CD 43: CD Re-mix (2008) Esoteric ECLEC 2061
Micky Jones, Deke Leonard, Martin Ace, Terry Williams, John Cipollina
The Welsh Connection LP (March 1976) MCA:  CD (2003) Point PNTVP102CD
Micky Jones, Deke Leonard, John McKenzie, Terry Williams, Phil Ryan
All's Well That Ends Well LP (November 1977) MCA MCF2815: CD (1998) Point EAMCD 068
Micky Jones, Deke Leonard, John McKenzie, Terry Williams, Phil Ryan
Friday 13th (January 1984) CD (June 2001) Point PNTVP106CD
Micky Jones, Deke Leonard, Martin Ace, John Weathers
The Twang Dynasty (November 1992) Road Goes On Forever: CD (1997) Point PNTVP113CD
Micky Jones, Deke Leonard, Martin Ace, John Weathers
Call Down the Moon CD (May 1995) Hypertension HYCD 200 154
Micky Jones, Deke Leonard, Martin Ace, John Weathers
1998 at the Star Club CD (1998) LC5768/LD5768
Micky Jones, Deke Leonard, Martin Ace, Bob Richards, Phil Ryan
Endangered Species CD (June 2000) Evangeline GEL 4001
Micky Jones, Deke Leonard, Martin Ace, Bob Richards, Phil Ryan
Down Town Live (2002) Altrichter Music AM 310559
Micky Jones, Deke Leonard, Martin Ace, Bob Richards
Undrugged (May 2002) Point PNTVP 121CD
Micky Jones, Deke Leonard, Martin Ace, Terry Williams/Bob Richards, Gareth Llewellyn Thorrington
Diamonds and Coal (November 2006) Point PNTVP 134 CD
George Jones, Josh Ace, Martin Ace, Bob Richards, Gareth Llewellyn Thorrington
Kingdom of Noise (June 2009) Point PNTVP 135 CD
Josh Ace, James Beck, Martin Ace, Rene Robrahn, Phil Ryan
Reanimated Memories (February 2015) Cherry Red EANTCD1046
Josh Ace, James Beck, Martin Ace, Rene Robrahn, Phil Ryan
Anachronism Tango (October 2019) Point PNTGZ109 CD
Josh Ace, James Beck, Martin Ace, Rene Robrahn

Archive albums
These Man albums were compiled and released retrospectively from previously un-issued archive tapes.
Some were issued as bootlegs, before being "ripped-off" by the band and issued "officially"

Greasy Truckers Party (Recorded 1972) CD (1997) Point PNTVP104CD
Micky Jones, Deke Leonard, Martin Ace, Terry Williams (the 2 Man tracks from the various artists "Greasy Truckers Party")
To Live For To Die (Recorded 1970) CD issued as "The Honest One" (1992) CD (1997) Point PNTVP108CD
Micky Jones, Deke Leonard, Martin Ace, Terry Williams, Clive John
Live At The Rainbow 1972 CD (1998) Point EAMCD060
Micky Jones, Clive John, Will Youatt, Terry Williams, Phil Ryan
The 1999 Party Tour (Recorded 1974) CD (1998) Point EAMCD069
Micky Jones, Deke Leonard, Malcolm Morley, Ken Whaley, Terry Williams (Morley is credited in the booklet, but not on the back cover)
Live In London 1975 CD (1998) Eagle Records EAMCD061
Micky Jones, Deke Leonard, Ken Whaley, Terry Williams
Live At Reading '83 (Recorded 1983) CD (1993) Raw Fruit FRSCD 010
Micky Jones, Deke Leonard, Martin Ace, John Weathers
The Official Bootleg (Recorded 1994) CD (June 2001) Point PNTVP109CD
Micky Jones, Deke Leonard, Martin Ace, John Weathers
Live at Crosskeys Institute 25th May 1984: Official Bootleg Series, Vol 1 CD - Effigy Music
Micky Jones, Deke Leonard, Martin Ace, John Weathers
Live at the Keystone Berkeley, 9th August 1976: Official Bootleg Series, Vol 2 Double CD - Effigy Music
Micky Jones, Deke Leonard, John McKenzie, Terry Williams, Phil Ryan + John Cippolina on 4 tracks
Live at Hebden Bridge Trades Club 11th December 2004: Official Bootleg Series, Vol 3 CD - Effigy Music
Micky Jones, George Jones, Martin Ace, Bob Richards, Gareth Thorrington

Compilation albums
Golden Hour Of Man Golden Hour Records LP (1973) 
Album on the Pye Golden Hour series: tracks from Revelation and 2 Ozs of Plastic with a Hole in the Middle
Green Fly Cherry Red Records LP (1986) D Late 1
Double LP with 11 Tracks from Be Good to Yourself..., Back into the Future, Rhinos, Winos and Lunatics, Slow Motion, and Maximum Darkness
Perfect Timing - The U.A. Years EMI LP (1991) 7 96542 1 CD (1991) CDP 7 96542 2 / CDEMS 1403
12 Tracks (11 studio & 1 live) from Man, Do You Like It Here Now..., Be Good to Yourself..., Back into the Future, Rhinos, Winos and Lunatics, Slow Motion, and Maximum Darkness
The Dawn Of Man CD (1997) Recall SMD CD 124
All of Revelation and 2 Ozs of Plastic with a Hole in the Middle plus the bonus singles
The Definitive Collection CD (1998) Castle CCSCD 832
All of Revelation and 2 Ozs of Plastic with a Hole in the Middle plus the Bystanders singles
3 Decades Of Man CD (2000) Point EAMCD099
From:- Do You Like It …? 1999 Party, Live In London, Welsh Connection, All’s Well…, Friday 13th, Twang Dynasty, and Live Official Bootleg
Rare Man CD (June 2001) Point PNTVP120CD
Singles, cassette-only tracks, Out-takes etc.
Man Alive CD (2003) Snapper Music SMDCD 478
From:- Greasy Truckers, Rainbow 1972, 1999 Party, BBC In Concert, All’s Well…, Friday 13th, and Glastonbury 1994
And In The Beginning (The Complete Early Man 1968-69) Double CD (December 2004) Castle Music CCDCD 921
All of Revelation and 2 Ozs of Plastic with a Hole in the Middle, the Pye singles, and 2 unreleased tracks from the 2 Ozs... session
Keep On Crinting (The Liberty/UA Years Anthology 1971-1975) Double CD (2006) EMI 94636066028
Album selections from Man through Slow Motion, plus live version of "The Storm" and the single "I'm Dreaming"
Sixty Minutes With Man CD (April 2007) Voiceprint VP6001CD
From:- Man, Do You Like It...?, Twang Dynasty, Call Down The Moon, "Diamonds & Coal & Bananas" single

Tribute album
Man We're Glad We Know You (2000) Pete Gifford Records PGRSCD

References

Discographies of British artists
Rock music group discographies